Life Before Insanity is the third studio album by Gov't Mule. The album was released on February 15, 2000, by Capricorn Records.

The album peaked at No. 16 on the Billboard Heatseekers Album Chart.

Production
The album was produced by Michael Barbiero.  Unlike the band's first two albums, Life Before Insanity utilized both overdubbing and multiple guest musicians. It was the last album recorded with founding member Allen Woody, who died in August 2000.

Critical reception
The Austin Chronicle wrote that "having Ben Harper cameo with Haynes on 'Lay Your Burden Down' is a guitarist's dream, but while the song rolls along, it never takes off—never reaches the pairing's potential." The Washington Post thought that the album "recalls the vintage blues-rock of the early Allman Brothers Band and Clapton's Cream."

Track listing
All songs by Warren Haynes unless otherwise noted.

Personnel
 Warren Haynes – guitar, slide guitar, vocals
 Allen Woody – bass, mandolin on "Life Before Insanity", electric upright bass on "Tastes Like Wine", rhythm guitar on "I Think You Know What I Mean", fretless bass on "Far Away", dulcitar on "In My Life"
 Matt Abts – drums, djembe, ashika on "In My Life"

Additional personnel
 Michael Barbiero – glockenspiel on "Far Away"
 Hook Herrera – harmonica on "Bad Little Doggie" and "I Think You Know What I Mean"
 Ben Harper – vocals and lap steel on "Lay Your Burden Down"
 Johnny Neel – organ, Wurlitzer piano and background vocals

Production
 Michael Barbiero – producer, engineer, mixing
 Ray Martin – mixing, additional engineering
 Warren Haynes – mixing
 Brodie Hutcheson – mixing, additional engineering
 Dan Jurow – additional engineering
 Greg Calbi – mastering
 Mark Pagliaro- guitar, bass, mandolin, amp, tech
 Daniel Saratec- drum, percussion tech

References

External links

Gov't Mule albums
2000 albums
Capricorn Records albums